Social Media Examiner is a U.S.-based media company, founded by Michael Stelzner. It publishes online magazines, blogs and podcasts  about how business people can use social networks, on SocialMediaExaminer.com. The online magazine publishes original research, has a weekly podcast show and oversees multiple communities for social media marketers.

Founder
In 2006, Michael Stelzner published his first book, Writing White Papers: How to Capture Readers and Keep them Engaged. He founded Social Media Examiner with the stated goal of providing free how-to information about social media. In 2011, Stelzner wrote Launch: How to Quickly Propel Your Business Beyond the Competition (Wiley). In 2012, Stelzner started the Social Media Marketing podcast.

Reports and conferences

In 2018, 5,700 marketers participated in Social Media Examiner's study of how marketers and businesses are using social media. The report has been cited in Entrepreneur and Inc. magazine. Social Media Examiner hosts the Social Media Marketing World conference.

Awards
Technorati ranks the site as one of the Top 100 Business and Top 100 Small Business blogs. Social Media Examiner has been discussed in several books including, The New Relationship Marketing: How to Build a Large, Loyal Profitable Network using the Social Web by Mari Smith, and The Entrepreneur’s Information Source Book: Charting the Path to Small Business Success, 2nd ed. by Susan C. Awe.

References

External links 
 Social Media Examiner website
 Social Media

American blogs
Audio podcasts
Websites about digital media
Mass media in San Diego County, California
Poway, California
Companies based in San Diego County, California
Internet properties established in 2009
Mass media companies established in 2009
2009 establishments in California